The electoral district of Moreton was a Legislative Assembly electorate in the state of Queensland. It was first created in a redistribution ahead of the 1878 colonial election, and existed until the 1912 state election.

Moreton replaced the former district of East Moreton, James Francis Garrick being the last member for East Moreton.

Moreton was abolished in 1912, replaced by the Electoral district of Murrumba.

Members for Moreton

Forsyth went on to represent Murrumba from April 1912 to March 1918.

See also
 1909 Moreton state by-election
 Electoral districts of Queensland
 Members of the Queensland Legislative Assembly by year
 :Category:Members of the Queensland Legislative Assembly by name

References

Former electoral districts of Queensland
1878 establishments in Australia
1912 disestablishments in Australia
Constituencies established in 1878
Constituencies disestablished in 1912